Andrea Brymer (born ) is a Scottish television presenter who is one of the main anchors for the Northern Scotland edition of STV News at Six.

Early life 
Brymer hails from the Angus town of Brechin. After attending high school, Brymer graduated with a B.A. Hons degree in Media Communications from Edinburgh's Queen Margaret University.

Career 
Brymer's television career started at Scottish Television (STV Central) in 1994 where she worked as a news assistant before becoming a features reporter on the lunchtime edition of Scotland Today, before moving onto presenting the main evening edition of the programme.

Brymer moved to Grampian Television (now STV North) in Aberdeen in 2002,
to become a reporter but soon began co-presenting North Tonight. Following a major revamp of the nightly news programme in 2006, she became the programme's chief solo anchor, a duty she shares with Norman Macleod.

During her time at STV, Andrea been one of the two main presenters chosen to co-host live pan-Scottish programmes on major stories. These include two Scottish elections, the North Sea helicopter crash in 2009, which killed 16 men and the Pope's visit to Scotland in 2010.

She has also fronted a variety of other programmes, including the cookery programme Desert Island Chefs, and co-host of STV's Hogmanay programme, from the Fireballs at Stonehaven. In 2007 she hosted 'Harbour Live', a series of programmes live from Peterhead and Arbroath.

Personal life 
Brymer has been married to Alan Ronald, an oil worker, since 1998. They live in Aberdeen with their four sons.

References

1972 births
Living people
Scottish television presenters
Scottish women television presenters
Scottish women journalists
STV News newsreaders and journalists